Slippery Jack is a name for:
An Acoustic band from Lawrence, KS
A species of mushroom, Suillus luteus
Any mushroom of the genus Suillus
A character from the children's television show Toad Patrol and Winx Club (mentioned)